Nelson Lee Gowan (born in 1961) is a Canadian novelist.

Gowan grew up on a farm near Swift Current, Saskatchewan, and studied at the University of British Columbia, where he received a Master of Fine Arts degree in creative writing. Gowan is presently based in Toronto where he heads the creative writing program at the School of Continuing Studies, University of Toronto.

At the 1996 Gemini Awards, Gowan was nominated for his screenplay Paris or Somewhere. In 2002 his novel Make Believe Love was nominated for the Trillium Award for Best Book in Ontario.

In 2006 his novel The Last Cowboy was published by Albin Michel in France as Jusqu'au bout du ciel.

Bibliography
 1990: Going to Cuba (Fifth House) 
 2001: Make Believe Love (Alfred A. Knopf) 
 2004: The Last Cowboy (Alfred A. Knopf) 
 2009: Confession (Alfred A. Knopf) 
 2021: The Beautiful Place (Thistledown Press)

External links
 Random House: Lee Gowan

1961 births
Living people
Canadian male novelists
People from Swift Current
University of British Columbia alumni
Academic staff of the University of Toronto
Writers from Saskatchewan
Canadian male screenwriters
Canadian Film Centre alumni
20th-century Canadian novelists
21st-century Canadian novelists
20th-century Canadian screenwriters
21st-century Canadian screenwriters
20th-century Canadian male writers
21st-century Canadian male writers